Nuno Miguel Mesquita Avelino (born 5 February 1976), is a Portuguese professional footballer who plays for FC Geneve as a goalkeeper.

Club career
Born in Porto, Avelino played for Porto youth ranks.

International career
After representing his country at youth level from the under-16s upwards to the under-18s, Avelino helped the national under-20s finish third in the 1995 FIFA World Youth Championship playing two games.

Honours

Country
Portugal
FIFA U-20 World Cup: Third place 1995

References

External links
 
 
 

1976 births
Living people
Portuguese footballers
Association football goalkeepers
Primeira Liga players
Liga Portugal 2 players
Portugal youth international footballers
Footballers from Porto
C.D. Tondela players
Varzim S.C. players
Boavista F.C. players
S.C. Freamunde players
F.C. Penafiel players
F.C. Marco players
Leça F.C. players
S.C. Beira-Mar players
F.C. Felgueiras players